Gerhard Larcher is an Austrian mathematician and professor of financial mathematics at the Johannes Kepler University (JKU) in Linz, Austria. He is the head of the Institute of Financial Mathematics.

Career 
Gerhard Larcher studied mathematics at the University of Salzburg from 1978 to 1982 and received his doctorate with the highest distinction sub auspiciis Praesidentis under Harald Niederreiter in 1985; he completed his postdoc in mathematics four years later.

From 1983 to 2000, Larcher worked at the University of Salzburg as an assistant professor and lecturer and from 1996 as an associate professor of mathematics. During this time he headed the Institute of Mathematics for two years. Since 1999 he was speaker and leader of the FWF-Research Center (FSP) Number-Theoretic Algorithms and their Applications.

In 2000, Larcher was appointed as a full professor of financial mathematics at the Johannes Kepler University (JKU) in Linz, Austria. Three years later, he founded the asset management company Art In Finance in Vienna, which developed and implemented alternative investment strategies. After years of strong profits, the option strategies of Art In Finance sustained massive losses in the course of the financial crisis in 2008. The strategies were then adapted accordingly and successfully reintroduced. At the start of 2017, he withdrew from the company and the asset management business. From 2003 to 2005, he was the department head of financial mathematics at the Johann Radon Institute for Computational and Applied Mathematics at the Austrian Academy of Sciences.

Since 2014 he has been the speaker of the Austrian special research area Quasi-Monte Carlo Methods: Theory and Applications at the Austrian Science Fund. In addition to his work at the Johannes Kepler University, Larcher runs seminars and workshops in the field of quantitative finance.

He is the author of the monograph Quantitative Finance: Strategien, Investments, Analysen published by Springer-Gabler Verlag, of the trilogy The Art of Quantitative Finance. Strategies, Investmens, Research by Springer and Die Black-Scholes-Theorie, In 100 Schritten vom Münzwurf zum Wirtschaftsnobelpreis also published by Springer.

In 2019, he founded the Linz School of Quantitative Finance (LSQF), a work group at the JKU Linz that deals with finance consulting and the creation of highly specialized finance software. Among other things, the LSQF team developed the Fynup Ratio, a new method for measuring the quality of investment funds based on machine learning techniques.

His work and research focuses on the development and analysis of trading strategies, the valuation of derivative finance products, Monte Carlo and quasi-Monte Carlo methods and number theory.

Awards 
 Science Award of Rotary Austria (1987)
 Christian Doppler Prize for Natural Sciences (1988)
 The Kardinal Innitzer Prize for the Advancement of Natural Sciences (1994)
 Prize of the Austrian Mathematical Society (1996)
 Edmund and Rosa Hlawa Prize for Mathematics of the Austrian Academy of Sciences (1997)

References

Living people
Academic staff of Johannes Kepler University Linz
Year of birth missing (living people)